is a former Japanese football player. She played for Japan national team.

Club career
Nasu was born in Nabari on July 31, 1984. She joined her local club Prima Ham FC Kunoichi (later Iga FC Kunoichi) in 1999. The club won the champions in 1999 season and the 2nd place in 2000 season. In 2007, she moved to INAC Kobe Leonessa. The club won the champions in 2011 season. In 2012, she returned to Iga FC Kunoichi. She retired end of 2016 season.

National team career
In August 2002, Nasu was selected Japan U-20 national team for 2002 U-19 World Championship. On August 1, 2009, she debuted for Japan national team against France. She played 3 games for Japan until 2011.

National team statistics

References

External links

Iga FC Kunochi

1984 births
Living people
Association football people from Mie Prefecture
Japanese women's footballers
Japan women's international footballers
Nadeshiko League players
Iga FC Kunoichi players
INAC Kobe Leonessa players
Women's association football midfielders